Iraklis Volleyball Club, or Iraklis Volley, is a volleyball team based in Thessaloniki, Macedonia, Greece. It plays in A1 Greek Volleyball League. Founded in the 1920s, they evolved in one of the most successful departments of G.S. Iraklis multi-sports club and one of the best teams in Greece and Europe, as they have won 5 times the Greek league (2002, 2005, 2007, 2008, 2012) and reached 3 times (2005, 2006, 2009) the final of the CEV Champions League.

Men's team

History

Iraklis was one of the first Greek clubs which encouraged volleyball before World War II. After the war, they were always among the top teams in Greece. The first National Championship was played in 1968 and Iraklis was also able to contribute to the National Teams with plenty of players. During the 70's, Iraklis participated twice in the championship finals, due to the contribution of Nikos Antoniadis. In 1987, 1989 and 1992 Iraklis made it to the European Cup and in 1997 came the outburst of the team.

Thanks to an organized effort, Iraklis played three consecutive Championship finals and finally won its first title -the Greek Cup- in 2000. Two years later, the team won both the Championship and the Cup titles, while finishing third in the CEV Champions League final-four held in Opole, Poland.

The next four years Iraklis dominated in Greece, confirming his superiority by winning one Championship (2005), three Greek Cups (2004, 2005, 2006) and two Greek Super Cups (2004, 2005), but mostly by participating in three more CEV Champions League final-fours. In 2004 in Belgorod, Russia, the team finished in the fourth place. Next year, the presence of world-class players such as Lloy Ball, Thomas Hoff and Clayton Stanley helped the team to reach the final-four which took place in Thessaloniki, Greece. Iraklis beat Lokomotiv Belgorod in the semi-final, but lost 1-3 to Tours VB in the final, despite the outstanding support by the fans. In 2006, Iraklis made it again to the final in Rome, Italy, to be beaten by Sisley Treviso 3-1. About 4,000 Iraklis fans traveled to Rome to support the team.

The following season marked the beginning of a transitional period. Many of the top players were released from the team, while the budget was cut in half. Even so, the team's dominance in Greece continued. In 2007, Iraklis finished third in regular season, but managed to win the Championship beating Olympiacos S.C. in the semi-finals and Panathinaikos VC in the finals, having both times a disadvantage. The next Championship (2007–08) had the same conclusion. Iraklis defeated Panathinaikos VC in the finals without losing a single game and won the championship for the fourth time in their history.

Current squad
Season 2016–2017

Technical and managerial staff

Notable former players

 Argentina
Rodrigo Quiroga
 Belgium
Frank Depestele
 Belarus
Olieg Achrem
 Bulgaria
Plamen Konstantinov
 Cuba
Freddy Brooks
Joël Despaigne
Rolando Despaigne
Ricardo Vante
 France
Frantz Granvorka
 Germany
Simon Tischer

 Greece
Andreas Andreadis
Nikos Antoniadis
Theodoros Baev
Theodoros Bozidis
Akis Chatziantoniou
Konstantinos Christofidelis
Christos Dimitrakopoulos
Marios Giourdas
Theoklitos Karipidis
Andrej Kravárik
Chrysanthos Kyriazis
Konstantinos Prousalis
Nikos Samaras
Nikolaos Smaragdis
Georgios Stefanou

 Italy
Matej Černič
 Serbia
Slobodan Boškan
 Sweden
Marcus Nilsson
 Turkey
Sinan Cem Tanık
 USA
Lloy Ball (FIVB Hall of Fame)
Brook Billings
Thomas Hoff
Clayton Stanley

Notable coaches 

 Alekos Leonis
 Flavio Gulinelli
 Anders Kristiansson (FIVB Hall of Fame)

Honours

Domestic
Greek League
 Winners (5): 2001–02, 2004–05, 2006–07, 2007–08, 2011–12
 Runners-up (8): 1970–71, 1974–75, 1998–99, 1999-00, 2000–01, 2002–03, 2005–06, 2010-11
Greek Cup
 Winners (6): 1999–00, 2001–02, 2004–05, 2004–05, 2005–06, 2011–12
 Runners-up (4): 2000–01, 2010–11, 2017–18, 2018–19
Greek Super Cup
 Winners (4) (record): 2004, 2005, 2007, 2008
 Runners-up (2): 2000, 2006
Greek A2 League
 Winners (1): 2018-19

European
CEV Champions League
 Runners-up (3): 2004-05, 2005-06, 2008-09
 Third place (1): 2001-02
 Fourth place (1): 2003-04

Sponsorships
Great Sponsor: Pame Stoixima
Official Sport Clothing Manufacturer: Patrick (sportswear company)
Official Broadcaster: Nova Sports

Women

Current Squad 2012/2013

External links
Official Sites
Iraklis VC - Official Site 
Press
Blue Arena 

Iraklis Thessaloniki
Iraklis V.C.
Greek volleyball clubs
Sports clubs in Thessaloniki
Volleyball clubs established in 1921
1921 establishments in Greece